Neocosmospora is a genus of fungi in the family Nectriaceae.

Species
Neocosmospora arxii
Neocosmospora boninensis
Neocosmospora endophytica
Neocosmospora indica
Neocosmospora parva
Neocosmospora spinulosa
Neocosmospora striata
Neocosmospora tenuicristata
Neocosmospora vasinfecta

Bioassay-guided fractionation of a fungus Neocosmospora sp. resulted in the isolation of three new resorcylic acid lactones, neocosmosin A (2), neocosmosin B (3) and neocosmosin C (4). Three known resorcylic acid lactones, monocillin IV (1), monocillin II (5) and radicicol (6) were also isolated and identified, where compounds 4–6 show good binding affinity for the human opioid receptors. These findings have important implications for the potential psychoactive effects with this class of compounds.

References

External links
 

Nectriaceae genera